The Dutch Headwind Cycling Championships (in Dutch: NK Tegenwindfietsen) are an annual Dutch cycling time trial championships that takes place during storms (wind force 7 or higher). They are not regulated by the Royal Dutch Cycling Union.

The Championships take place on the Oosterscheldekering storm barrier, which faces the North Sea, and have been held in fall or winter since 2013. Competitors must ride the 8.5 km course against the wind on upright single-speed bicycles, which are provided by the organization. The championships are announced three days before a storm is expected. Since 2014 there is also a team time trial. A total of 200 individual cyclists (300 cyclists in 2020) can participate, plus 25 teams of four cyclists. Participants start 30 seconds apart from each other and the one with the fastest time wins.

In 2020 both the male and female reigning champions (from 2018) successfully defended their titles.

Editions

See also
 Dutch National Time Trial Championships
 Dutch National Road Race Championships

References

Cycling in Zeeland
Dutch National Time Trial Championships
National road cycling championships
Storm
Wind
Cycle races in the Netherlands
2013 establishments in the Netherlands
National championships in the Netherlands